Shehar Aur Sapna is 1963 Hindi film directed by Khwaja Ahmad Abbas, about a young couple searching in vain for a home of their own in a metropolis, amidst the backdrop of rapidly developing city, and the many who flocked to it in hope for a better life. It won the 1964 National Film Award for Best Feature Film and was nominated for Filmfare Award for Best Film.

Synopsis and themes
It was based on Abbas's own story One Thousand Nights on a Bed of Stones, which describes the struggle in the life of pavement dwellers in the backdrop of rapid industrialization. The theme of the film signified a marked departure from the films made in 1950s, the opening decade of independent India, as by now the euphoria seen in films such as Naya Daur (1957) and Boot Polish (1954) had been replaced by realism and the death of economic idealism. This was also seen in later films such as Roti Kapda Aur Makaan (1974) and Mani Kaul's Uski Roti  (1969), as industrialization didn't turn out to be a boon for the masses as promised.

Production
Abbas used his own experiences of sleeping on the footpath at one point in his life, as he had used in his three other films. To prepared for shooting the city "figuratively", he walked about the city under all weather, to be able to recreate the settings for the emotional landscape of the film. Though most scenes were shot outdoors, in Mumbai slums and roads, on a shoestring budget, for crucial scenes, the cylindrical drainpipes were carried to the studios to recreate the life of the urban poor indoors, complete with slums and huts by the railway line.

Awards
 1963: National Film Award for Best Feature Film
 1964 Academy of Art award for Direction.
 1964: Filmfare Awards
Best Supporting Actor - Nana Palsikar: Won
Best Film: Nominated 
Best Director: K.A. Abbas: Nominated
 Best Story: K.A. Abbas: Nominated
 Uttar Pradesh Film Journalist's Assn. Lucknow Award for Best Music/Director: J.P. Kaushik
 Bengal Film Journalist's Assn. Calcutta Award for Best Music/Director: J.P. Kaushik

Cast
 Dilip Raj Son of P. Jairaj
 Surekha Parkaar
 Manmohan Krishan
 Anwar Hussain 
 David 
 Nana Palsikar as Jhonny
 Asit Sen 
 Jagdish Kamal
 Rashid Khan
 Kamlakar Rele (Thief)

Music
"Hazar Ghar Hazar Dar Yeh Sab  Hain Ajnabi Magar" - Manmohan Krishna
"Patthar Ka Bhagwan Yehan  Hain" - Manmohan Krishna
"Pyaar Ko Aaj Nayi Tarh  Nibhana Hoga" - Manmohan Krishna
"Yeh Shaam Bhi Kahaan Hui" - Manmohan Krishna

References

External links
 
 Shehar Aur Sapna Trivia

1963 films
1960s Hindi-language films
Films based on short fiction
Films about poverty in India
Social realism in film
Films set in Mumbai
Films directed by K. A. Abbas
Best Feature Film National Film Award winners
Films with screenplays by Khwaja Ahmad Abbas